International Revolutionary Left is a Trotskyist international tendency that split from the Committee for a Workers' International in 2019.

Background 
Following a disagreement with International Marxist Tendency (IMT) in 2009, the leadership of the Spanish, Venezuelan, and Mexican sections decided to break with IMT. These groups formed  and, in 2017, decided to merge with Committee for a Workers' International (CWI).

Formation 

In 2019, a major rift formed within the CWI between the minority "In Defence of a Working Class and Trotskyist CWI" faction and the International Executive Committee-led majority. While the Portuguese and Spanish sections aligned themselves with the minority faction, they had a falling out. They soon, along with the Mexican and Venezuelan sections, left the CWI altogether to form the International Revolutionary Left.

At their founding congress on 22 July 2019 in Madrid, the delegates were joined by representatives from the German section  who had earlier in the month voted to affiliate with the group.

Sections

References

External links

 
2019 establishments in Spain
Political organizations established in 2019